PB-51 Chaman-II is a constituency of the Provincial Assembly of Balochistan.

General elections 2013

General elections 2008

See also

 PB-50 Chaman-I

 PB-1 Sherani-cum-Zhob

References

External links
 Election commission Pakistan's official website
 Awazoday.com check result
 Balochistan's Assembly official site

Constituencies of Balochistan